The Korean People's Association in Manchuria (KPAM, August 1929 – September 1931) was an autonomous anarchist zone in Manchuria near the Korean borderlands, populated by two million Korean migrants. The society operated within the framework of a gift economy based upon mutual aid.

Background
Following the outbreak of the Donghak Peasant Revolution of 1894, the Empire of Japan intervened in Korea, which brought the peninsula under Japanese influence. Meanwhile, the Japanese invasion of Manchuria had caused heightened tensions with the Russian Empire, which was itself also occupying Manchuria. Following the subsequent Russo-Japanese War, the Empire of Japan secured vast concessions in Manchuria, taking control of the railways, establishing a number of imperial enclaves and eventually consolidating its military forces into the Kwantung Army. Korea was itself formally annexed by the Empire of Japan in the Japan–Korea Treaty of 1910, forcing many Korean dissidents to flee into exile in Manchuria, where they established study groups and military schools in order to prepare the Korean independence movement for action. Following the repression of the March 1st Movement, even more Koreans fled to Manchuria, leading to the development of the Korean anarchist movement in exile.

Meanwhile, the collapse of the Empire of China had given way to the Warlord Era, during which Manchuria came under the control of Zhang Zuolin. When he first rose to power, the Empire of Japan attempted to assassinate Zhang, but by 1924 they began bankrolling his activities due to his anti-communism, with Zhang going on to collaborate in repressing the Korean resistance in Manchuria. In June 1927, Zhang's Fengtian clique seized control of the Beiyang government and proclaimed the establishment of a military dictatorship. As Zhang was pulled into engagements with the National Revolutionary Army, the Japanese government started looking to destablize his hold on power and take control of Manchuria. By June 1928, the Northern Expedition had forced Zhang to flee Beijing and retreat back to Manchuria by train. A few miles outside the Manchurian capital of Mukden, his train was blown up by Japanese imperial agents, killing him and sixteen other passengers. He was succeeded as warlord of Manchuria by his son, Zhang Xueliang, who took a decisively anti-Japanese stance and aligned himself with the Nationalist government.

History
The anti-Japanese sentiment of the new administration in Manchuria opened up space for the Korean anarchist movement to restart its activities, now safe from political repression. This process culminated, on July 21, 1929, with the establishment of the Korean Anarchist Federation in Manchuria (KAFM) in Hailin. The KAFM was primarily focused on providing mutual aid for all Koreans in Manchuria, with the eventual goal being to establish a stateless society based on liberty and social equality, in which resources were to be distributed "from each according to their ability, to each according to their needs".

By this time, three self-governing Korean authorities had been established in Manchuria: the General Staff Headquarters on the Manchurian side of the Yalu River; the Righteous Government in the provinces of Jilin and Liaoning; and the New People's Government in northern Manchuria, led by Kim Chwa-chin. Although initially driven by Korean nationalism, the New People's Government increasingly began to take up anarchist principles, in order to counter the rising influence of Marxism–Leninism in the region. This culminated in August 1929, when the New People's Government and the KAFM were integrated into the Korean People's Association in Manchuria (KPAM), with Kim Chwa-chin being elected as its chairperson.

The KPAM's plan was to develop systems of cooperative agriculture, free education and arms training in Manchuria. Its primary goal was to meet the immediate material needs of Korean migrant workers and to protect them from exploitation, both by Chinese landlords and Korean nationalist authorities. In order to help them settle and cultivate land, it introduced collective farming, which collectivized the production and sale of agricultural produce. Although Korean nationalists cooperated in the KPAM, nationalist goals of independence were subordinated to the immediate survival of Korean migrant workers, grounded in the Korean anarchists' principles of mutual aid. Activities that would have agitated for an independent and/or anarchist Korea were postponed, in favor of sustaining their economic programs.

The Korean autonomous zone in Manchuria was eventually encircled by Imperial Japanese forces in the south and Soviet forces in the north, with covert operatives being sent into the territory to target prominent Korean anarchists. The KPAM began to suffer a number of difficulties with the loss of many of its leading figures: on January 20, 1930, Kim Chwa-chin was assassinated by Korean communists while repairing a rice mill; in September 1930, Yi Eulgyu was arrested by Japanese imperial police and extradited back to Korea; and in July 1931, Kim Jongjin was assassinated. Finally, on September 18, 1931, the Japanese invasion put a definitive end to the Korean anarchist experiment in Manchuria, with the puppet state of Manchukuo being established in its place. The remnants of the Korean anarchist organizations retreated to southern China, where many of them volunteered to fight in the Second Sino-Japanese War.

Governance 
The KPAM defined itself as an "autonomous, self-governing, cooperative organization." Its representative system and administrative body were designed, according to anarchist principle of self-governance, to be a "government without [compulsory] government". Decisions were largely made in village assemblies, with a decentralized federation of councils at the village, district and regional levels dealing with larger matters.

The KPAM drew heavily from the economic theories of libertarian socialism and established give-away shops, worker cooperatives and democratic schools throughout their territories. Regional councils were also created. In the meanwhile, they appointed higher-level staff (who only received average wage) from the top down, with lower levels of officials regionally chosen. Organization and propaganda teams worked with agitating the populace, both to get the farmer's support and to get them to create independent village assemblies and committees. Seemingly, these teams were welcome to almost everywhere they went, with no major incidents being noted.

The , commanded by General Kim Chwa-chin, formed the military of Shinmin Prefecture. Effectively a peasant militia, the army's experienced soldiers were supplemented by guerrillas, trained in the prefecture's military academy, with which the army waged guerrilla warfare against both the Empire of Japan and Soviet Union. It also established a Safety Unit and an Anti-Japanese Guerrilla Unit, in order to protect Koreans from local bandits and Imperial Japanese forces respectively.

See also 
Makhnovshchina
People's Republic of Korea
Revolutionary Catalonia
Yanbian Korean Autonomous Prefecture

Notes

References

Bibliography

Further reading

1929 establishments in China
1931 disestablishments in China
Korean diaspora in China
Agricultural cooperatives
Anarchism in China
Anarchism in Korea
Anarchist collectives
Anarchist communities
Cooperatives in China
History of Manchuria
Korean independence movement